Transcription factor LBX1 is a protein that in humans is encoded by the LBX1 gene.

This gene and the orthologous mouse gene were found by their homology to the Drosophila lady bird early and late homeobox genes. 

In the mouse, this gene is a key regulator of muscle precursor cell migration and is required for the acquisition of dorsal identities of forelimb muscles.

References

Further reading